Simdega district  is one of the twenty-four districts of Jharkhand state, India, and Simdega town is the administrative headquarters of this district. This district is the least population density district of jharkhand(2011).This district was carved out from erstwhile Gumla district on 30 April 2001. It is currently a part of the Red Corridor.
As of 2011 it is the third least populous district of Jharkhand (out of 24), after Lohardaga and Khunti districts.

Economy
In 2006 the Ministry of Panchayati Raj named Simdega one of the country's 250 most backward districts (out of a total of 640). It is one of the 21 districts in Jharkhand currently receiving funds from the Backward Regions Grant Fund Programme (BRGF).

Politics 

 |}

Administration

Blocks/Mandals 
The following are the list of blocks (10 blocks) in Simdega district.

Villages 
 

Khutitoli

Demographics

According to the 2011 census Simdega district has a population of 599,578, roughly equal to the nation of Solomon Islands or the US state of Wyoming. This gives it a ranking of 526th in India (out of a total of 640).
Its population growth rate over the decade 2001-2011 was 16.62%. Simdega has a sex ratio of 1000 females for every 1000 males, and a literacy rate of 67.59%. It is the only Christian majority district in Jharkhand. Schedule Caste (SC) constitutes 7.5% while Schedule Tribe (ST) were 70.8% of total population.

At the time of the 2011 Census of India, 53.91% of the population in the district spoke Sadri, 22.50% Mundari, 15.44% Kharia, 4.02% Hindi, 1.44% Kurukh and 1.36% Urdu as their first language.

Culture

Popular places in Simdega District
 Chhinda Dam
 Ramrekha dham - it is commonly believed by the tribals in the area that Lord Rama had visited this place in his exile years.
 Ramjanki Mandir
 Gandhi Maidan
 Kelaghagh
 Kobang Dam
 sarna mandir
 Dhangadi- It is a picnic place of Shankh river in bolba block. Where naturally rocks cut by river water looked very attractive.

See also
 Districts of Jharkhand

References

External links
 Simdega district website

 
Districts of Jharkhand
2001 establishments in Jharkhand